Royal Air Force Long Newnton or more simply RAF Long Newnton is a former Royal Air Force satellite airfield in north Wiltshire, England, close to the Gloucestershire village of Long Newnton.

The following units were here at some point:
 No. 3 (Pilots) Advanced Flying Unit RAF
 No. 3 Service Flying Training School RAF
 No. 9 Service Flying Training School RAF
 No. 11 Maintenance Unit RAF
 No. 14 Service Flying Training School RAF
 No. 15 (Pilots) Advanced Flying Unit RAF
 Cotswold Gliding Club

References

Royal Air Force stations in Wiltshire